Ottersbo is a village in the municipality of Ørland in Trøndelag county, Norway.

Ottersbo was built during the years 1977–1980.

References

Villages in Trøndelag
Ørland